Cary, North Carolina, held an election for mayor on Tuesday, October 11, 2011. Harold Weinbrecht, the incumbent mayor, faced off against Michelle Muir, a businesswoman and former member of the Cary Chamber of Commerce. Weinbrecht defeated Muir, winning re-election to a second term in office.

Candidates
Harold Weinbrecht, Mayor of Cary since 2007
Michelle Muir, businesswoman

Endorsements

Results

Notes

External links

Cary
Cary
Cary